National Security Affairs Cell is a branch under the Cabinet Division of Bangladesh tasked with reviewing the activities and problems relating to internal state security. It operates under the support of the National Committee on Security Affairs (NCSA). Asaduzzaman Mia is the first and incumbent chief executive officer (CEO) of the cell. He was made CEO ON 14 September 2019.

See also
 National Committee for Intelligence Coordination

References

Bangladeshi intelligence agencies
Government agencies of Bangladesh
Government agencies established in 2019